Muncaster Mill railway station is a railway station on the  gauge Ravenglass & Eskdale Railway in Cumbria, England. It is situated on the bank of the River Mite and adjacent to Muncaster Mill, formerly a watermill but now a private house, from which it takes its name.

Facilities
There is a passenger shelter and disabled-access toilet at the station. There is a siding built into the platform surface, which was formerly used for storage of permanent way engineers' rolling stock, and by shuttle trains on Gala event days.  However, the siding has since been disconnected from the main line, by the removal of the points.

Although previously staffed by a station master, the station (in common with all intermediate stops on the railway) is now unmanned, with trains stopping by request.

Accessibility
The platform is not long enough to accommodate step-free access to the disabled carriages, which are normally located towards the eastern end of each train set, on both the eastbound and westbound journeys.

Gallery

References 

Heritage railway stations in Cumbria
Ravenglass and Eskdale Railway
Railway stations in Great Britain opened in 1876
Railway stations in Great Britain closed in 1908
Railway stations in Great Britain opened in 1915
Railway stations in Great Britain closed in 1924
Railway stations in Great Britain opened in 1967